Homonoea ornamentalis is a species of beetle in the family Cerambycidae. It was described by Heller in 1926. It is known from the Philippines.

Subspecies
 Homonoea ornamentalis mindanaonis Breuning, 1980
 Homonoea ornamentalis ornamentalis Heller, 1926

References

Homonoeini
Beetles described in 1926